Inside Concentration Camps: Social Life at the Extremes is a book by Maja Suderland, a professor at Darmstadt University, which was published in 2013. It extends previous research by Paul Martin Neurbath and Zygmunt Bauman. It was translated from German into English by Jessica Spengler.

References

2013 non-fiction books
History books about Nazi concentration camps
Polity (publisher) books